Frida Melvær  (born 29 September 1971) is a Norwegian politician. 
She was elected representative to the Storting for the period 2017–2021 for the Conservative Party. In the Storting, she is a member of the Standing Committee on Justice.

References

1971 births
Living people
Conservative Party (Norway) politicians
Members of the Storting
Sogn og Fjordane politicians